Hazelbrook railway station is located on the Main Western line in New South Wales, Australia. It serves the Blue Mountains town of Hazelbrook.

Hazelbrook Railway Station is an express stop station, there are three morning express trains heading east, and three afternoon express trains heading west. Neighbouring express stations are Springwood (east) and Wentworth Falls (west).

History
The station opened in 1884.

In December 2019 an upgrade to the station was complete which included a new lift.

Platforms & services
Hazelbrook has one island platform with two sides. It is serviced by NSW TrainLink Blue Mountains Line services travelling from Sydney Central to Lithgow.

Transport links
Blue Mountains Transit operate two routes via Hazelbrook station:
685H: to Springwood
690K: Springwood to Katoomba

References

External links

Hazelbrook station details Transport for New South Wales

Easy Access railway stations in New South Wales
Railway stations in Australia opened in 1884
Regional railway stations in New South Wales
Short-platform railway stations in New South Wales, 6 cars
Main Western railway line, New South Wales